Madison is a village in Lake County, Ohio, United States. The population was 3,184 at the 2010 census.

Madison was incorporated as a village in 1867.

Geography

Demographics

2010 census
As of the 2010 census  there were 3,184 people, 1,241 households, and 903 families living in the village. The racial makeup of the village was 96.3% White, 0.6% African American, 0.1% Native American, 0.5% Asian, 0.8% from other races, and 1.6% from two or more races. Hispanic or Latino of any race were 1.5% of the population.

There were 1,241 households, of which 34.6% had children under the age of 18 living with them, 58.5% were married couples living together, 11.0% had a female householder with no husband present, 3.2% had a male householder with no wife present, and 27.2% were non-families. 23.7% of all households were made up of individuals, and 10.5% had someone living alone who was 65 years of age or older. The average household size was 2.55 and the average family size was 2.98.

The median age in the village was 41.1 years. 25.2% of residents were under the age of 18; 5.6% were between the ages of 18 and 24; 26.4% were from 25 to 44; 28% were from 45 to 64; and 14.7% were 65 years of age or older. The gender makeup of the village was 47.5% male and 52.5% female.

2000 census
As of the 2000 census there were 2,921 people, 1,107 households, and 801 families living in the village. The population density was 638.1 people per square mile (246.2/km2). There were 1,171 housing units at an average density of 255.8 per square mile (98.7/km2). The racial makeup of the village was 90.45% White, 8.36% African American, 0.14% Native American, 0.21% Asian, 0.14% from other races, and 0.72% from two or more races. Hispanic or Latino of any race were 0.82% of the population. 22.0% were of German, 14.4% Irish, 13.0% American, 10.4% English, 9.1% Italian and 6.9% Polish ancestry according to Census 2000.
There were 1,107 households, out of which 35.1% had children under the age of 18 living with them, 61.1% were married couples living together, 7.9% had a female householder with no husband present, and 27.6% were non-families. 24.0% of all households were made up of individuals, and 10.7% had someone living alone who was 65 years of age or older. The average household size was 2.61 and the average family size was 3.11

In the village, the population was spread out, with 26.2% under the age of 18, 6.0% from 18 to 24, 31.7% from 25 to 44, 23.3% from 45 to 64, and 12.7% who were 65 years of age or older. The median age was 37 years. For every 100 females there were 98.7 males. For every 100 females age 18 and over, there were 96.8 males.

The median income for a household in the village was $50,786, and the median income for a family was $56,761. Males had a median income of $43,897 versus $25,639 for females. The per capita income for the village was $20,621. About 2.3% of families and 3.4% of the population were below the poverty line, including 3.2% of those under age 18 and 2.5% of those age 65 or over.

Notable people

 Rosa Miller Avery (1830–1894), American abolitionist, political reformer, suffragist, writer
 Steve LaTourette, former member of the U.S. House of Representatives, representing Ohio's 14th congressional district.
 Frederick Burr Opper, a pioneer of U.S. newspaper comic strips.
 Rachel Jamison Webster, an award-winning poet, writer, and teacher affiliated with Northwestern University.

References

External links
 

Villages in Lake County, Ohio
Villages in Ohio
1867 establishments in Ohio